John VII was Patriarch of Jerusalem from 964 to 966. He was among the bishops of Jerusalem who suffered a martyr's death at the hands of Muslim mobs.

John VII was elected patriarch after the death of his predecessor Agathon in 964. Two versions of his martyrdom have come down to us. The first involved revenge by the ruling governor. 

John became patriarch during the rule of the Ikhshidid governor Muhammad Ismail ibn al-Sanaji in Jerusalem. Muhammad was one who demanded gifts be made to him on every occasion, gifts that were a major expense on the patriarchate. About this demand, Patriarch John complained to El Hasan, governor of Ramleh. In 966, after having complained several times, Muhammad took revenge on John by stirring up the Muslim mobs against the patriarch. On a rampage, the mob descended on the Church of the Holy Sepulchre, setting it on fire, and causing its cupola to collapse. Then, the mob turned to the church on Mount Zion, which they also burned. The next day the mob continued its reign of destruction during which they found John hiding in the oil cistern of the Church of the Holy Sepulchre, and murdered him. Following his murder the mob took his corpse to the yard of the Church where they burned it.

A second version of his martyrdom maintains John was burned at the stake by a Muslim mob after writing to the Byzantine Emperor Nikephoros II Phokas, pleading with him to hasten to Palestine and retake it from the Fatimid caliphs, who, however, did not take control of Palestine until the 970s.

References

Sources
 The History of the Church of Jerusalem

10th-century patriarchs of Jerusalem
966 deaths
People executed by burning
Executed priests
Victims of anti-Christian violence
Persecution of Christians by Muslims
Year of birth unknown
People of the Ikhshidid dynasty